1986 Italian Athletics Indoor Championships was the 17th edition of the Italian Athletics Indoor Championships and were held in Genoa.

Results

Men

Women

References

External links
 

Italian Athletics Championships
Athletics
Italian Athletics Indoor Championships